The Wilhelm scream is a stock sound effect that has been used in a number of films and TV series, beginning in 1951 with the film Distant Drums. The scream is usually used when someone is shot, falls from a great height, or is thrown from an explosion. The sound is named after Private Wilhelm, a character in The Charge at Feather River, a 1953 Western in which the character gets shot in the thigh with an arrow. This was its first use following its inclusion in the Warner Bros. stock sound library, although The Charge at Feather River is the third film to use the effect. The scream is believed to be voiced by actor Sheb Wooley.

History
The Wilhelm scream originates from a series of sound effects recorded for the 1951 movie Distant Drums. In a scene from the film, soldiers fleeing Seminole Indians are wading through a swamp in the Everglades, and one of them is bitten and dragged underwater by an alligator. The screams for that scene, and other scenes in the movie, were recorded later in a single take. The recording was entitled: "Man getting bit by an alligator, and he screams." The fifth take of the scream was used for the soldier in the alligator scene. That take, which later became known as the iconic "Wilhelm scream", is thought to have been voiced by actor Sheb Wooley (who also played the uncredited role of Pvt. Jessup in Distant Drums). As of late 2022, the scream has not been made available in any commercial sound effects library.

Voice of the scream
Research by motion picture sound designer Ben Burtt suggests that Wooley, best known for his 1958 novelty song "The Purple People Eater", and his character of Indian scout Pete Nolan on the television series Rawhide, is likely to have been the voice actor who originally performed the scream. This has been supported by an interview in 2005 with Linda Dotson, Wooley's widow. Burtt discovered records at Warner Bros. from the editor of Distant Drums, including a short list of names of actors scheduled to record lines of dialogue for miscellaneous roles in the movie. Wooley was one of a few actors assembled for the recording of additional "pick-up" vocal elements for the film. Dotson confirmed Wooley's scream had been in many Westerns, adding, "He always used to joke about how he was so great about screaming and dying in films."

Uses

The scream can be heard in the 1954 George Cukor film A Star Is Born, in a scene in a studio projection room. Until the mid-1970s, the sound effect was used regularly, but only in Warner Bros. productions. These include: Them! (1954), Land of the Pharaohs (1955), The Sea Chase (1955), Sergeant Rutledge (1960), PT 109 (1963), and The Green Berets (1968). The Wilhelm scream became iconic in popular culture when Burtt, who had come across the original recording on a studio archive sound reel, incorporated it into the scene in Star Wars (1977) in which Luke Skywalker shoots a stormtrooper off a ledge. The effect is heard as the stormtrooper is falling. Burtt named the scream after Pvt. Wilhelm, and adopted it as his personal sound signature. Burtt also found use for the effect in More American Graffiti (1979); and over the next decade he incorporated it into other films that he worked on, such as Willow (1988). Other Burtt projects including several George Lucas or Steven Spielberg films. Notably, the rest of the Star Wars films, as well as the Indiana Jones movies included the effect. Filmmaker Jon Favreau resurrected the scream for episode 1 of The Book of Boba Fett, which is a spin-off of the Star Wars series The Mandalorian.

Other sound designers have picked up and used the sound effect. Inclusion of the sound in films became a tradition among a certain community of sound designers.  Sound designer Gary Rydstrom included the effect in his 2006 directorial debut, the Pixar short film, Lifted. The sound effect is heard in: Reservoir Dogs (1992), Kill Bill: Volume 1 (2003), Lethal Weapon 4 (1998), The Lord of the Rings: The Two Towers (2002), and Transformers. The effect has appeared in several animated Disney and Pixar films, such as The Incredibles, Toy Story, and Cars franchises, and A Goofy Movie (1995). Weddington Productions—that employs such sound directors as Mark Mangini, David Whittaker, Steve Lee and George Simpson—and is owned by Burtt's friend and colleague, Richard Anderson, have used the effect in productions of Beauty and the Beast (1991), Aladdin (1992), The Fifth Element (1997), The Majestic (2001), Just Visiting (2001), A Man Apart (2003), and Tears of the Sun (2003). Director Joe Dante, beginning with his first major film, Hollywood Boulevard (1976), included it in his later films: Explorers (1985), Gremlins 2 (1990), The Second Civil War (1997), Matinee (1993), and Looney Tunes: Back in Action (2003).

The Wilhelm scream has made its way into television series, such as Maverick, Game of Thrones, Breaking Bad, My Little Pony: Friendship Is Magic,  Lizzie McGuire, The Fairly OddParents, The Simpsons, The X-Files, Angel, Futurama, Invader Zim, The Shield, Sons of Anarchy, The Powerpuff Girls, Star Trek: Enterprise, The Venture Bros., and Family Guy.

Video games have made use of the scream, as it is heard in video games such as Red Dead Redemption (during gunfights), The First Templar, Rayman Origins, Grand Theft Auto V, The Witcher 3, Midnight Club, Star Wars Battlefront II.

See also
 List of filmmaker's signatures

Explanatory notes

References

External links
 Wilhelm Scream Sample (1951) from The Community Audio collection at the Internet Archive
 Most Popular "Wilhelm Scream" Titles at IMDb.com
 Wilhelm Scream remastered files (free to use)
 Wilhelm Scream Compilation on YouTube.com; 14:06

1951 in film
1951 works
Easter egg (media)
Sound effects
In-jokes